Akkineni Sreekar Prasad is an Indian film editor. He works predominantly in Telugu, Malayalam, Tamil, and Hindi language films. In a career spanning more than 35 years, he has edited over 600 films. He is a recipient of nine National Film Awards including seven wins for Best Editing which is a record in that category. He also won five Kerala State Film Awards, two Andhra Pradesh state Nandi Awards, and two Filmfare Awards among others.

He was included in the Limca Book of Records 'People of the Year - 2013' list for his contribution to Indian cinema in several languages. Prasad also holds the record for "films edited in most number of languages" in Limca Book of Records. He has edited films from 17 languages so far.

Early and personal life
Sreekar Prasad was born into a Telugu family in Madras to film editor and director Akkineni Sanjeevi, the younger brother of Telugu film doyen L. V. Prasad. His family hails from the village of Somavarappadu near Eluru in Andhra Pradesh. His father had five siblings  four brothers and a sister. Akkineni Ramesh Prasad, son of L. V. Prasad is his cousin. K. B. Tilak, independence activist and filmmaker is also a cousin of his  the son of his paternal aunt.

His son is Akshay Akkineni, director of Pizza. Akshay is married to P. S. Keerthana, daughter of actors R. Parthiban and Seetha. Sreekar was the editor of Keerthana's star vehicle Kannathil Muthamittal, which earned her the National Film Award for Best Child Artist in 2002.

Career
Sreekar Prasad was a graduate of literature from University of Madras. He learned the art of film editing from his father in Telugu films. Though he started out with Telugu films, he rose to national acclaim through Malayalam and Tamil films. He has won the National Film Award for Best Editing seven times and one Special Jury Award, throughout a career spanning over two decades. 

Some of the notable editing works of Sreekar Prasad include Yodha (1992), Nirnayam (1995), Vanaprastham (1999), Alaipayuthey (2000), Dil Chahta Hai (2001), Kannathil Muthamittal (2002), Okkadu (2003), Aaytha Ezhuthu/Yuva (2004), Navarasa (2005), Anandabhadram (2005), Guru (2007), Billa (2007),  Firaaq (2008), Pazhassi Raja (2009) and Talvar (2015).

Awards
National Film Awards
 1989: Best Editing - Raakh
 1997: Best Editing - Rag Birag
 1997: Best Non-Feature Film Editing - Nauka Caritramu
 1998: Best Editing - The Terrorist
 2000: Best Editing - Vaanaprastham
 2002: Best Editing - Kannathil Muthamittal
 2008: Best Editing - Firaaq
 2010: Special Jury Award - Kutty Srank, Kaminey, Kerala Varma Pazhassi Raja
 2020: Best Editing - Sivaranjiniyum Innum Sila Pengalum

Kerala State Film Awards
 1992: Best Editing - Yodha
 1999: Best Editing - Karunam, Vaanaprastham, Jalamarmaram
 2001: Best Editing - Sesham
 2005: Best Editing - Anandabhadram
 2009: Best Editing - Pazhassi Raja

Nandi Awards
 2000: Best Editing - Manoharam
 2003: Best Editing - Okkadu

Filmfare Awards
 2002: Best Editing - Dil Chahta Hai
 2010: Best Editing - Firaaq
2016: Best Editing - Talvar

Vijay Awards
 2007: Best Editing - Kattradhu Thamizh
 2009: Best Editing - Yavarum Nalam

Other awards
 2008: DIFF Best Editing - Firaaq

Filmography

See also
 National Film Award for Best Editing

References

External links
 Official website
 https://web.archive.org/web/20141218164322/http://www.watchserialtamil.com/
 

Hindi film editors
Living people
Telugu people
Filmfare Awards winners
Malayalam film editors
Best Editor National Film Award winners
Tamil film editors
University of Madras alumni
Kerala State Film Award winners
Telugu film editors
Film editors from Andhra Pradesh
Special Jury Award (feature film) National Film Award winners
1963 births